The Ministry of Environment and Climate Action is a Portuguese government ministry.

External links 
  

Portugal
Environment